Kiyoshi Nakamura may refer to:

, Japanese middle-distance runner
, Japanese footballer